The 2022–23 season is the 133rd season in the existence of Brentford Football Club and its second consecutive season in the Premier League. In addition to the Premier League, the club also competed in the FA Cup and the EFL Cup.

First team squad

 Players' ages are as of the opening day of the 2022–23 season.

Transfers

Transfers in

Loans in

Loans out

Transfers out

Pre-season and friendlies

Competitions

Overall record

Premier League

League table

Results summary

Results by round

Matches

FA Cup

EFL Cup

Statistics

Appearances and goals

 Source: Soccerbase

Goalscorers 

Source: Soccerbase

Discipline 

 Source: ESPN

International caps 

Only international caps won while contracted to Brentford are counted.

Honours 

 Premier League Goal of the Month: Ivan Toney (September 2022)

See also
 2022–23 in English football
 List of Brentford F.C. seasons

References 

Brentford F.C. seasons
Brentford
Brentford
Brentford